Kingsley Amuneke (born 26 July 1980) is a former Nigerian footballer who played as a defender.

Football career
Born in Eziobodo, Amuneke played professionally for two clubs in Belgium and for Landskrona BoIS in the Swedish Allsvenskan. He is the younger brother of Emmanuel Amunike, and the older sibling of another footballer, Kevin Amuneke; all three spent some time playing in Portugal.

References

External links

1980 births
Living people
Nigerian footballers
Association football defenders
Belgian Pro League players
S.C. Eendracht Aalst players
F.C.V. Dender E.H. players
Allsvenskan players
Landskrona BoIS players
IFK Värnamo players
Nigerian expatriate footballers
Expatriate footballers in Belgium
Expatriate footballers in Portugal
Expatriate footballers in Sweden
Expatriate footballers in the Faroe Islands
Nigerian expatriate sportspeople in Belgium
Nigerian expatriate sportspeople in Portugal
Nigerian expatriate sportspeople in Sweden